The 2017 European Shooting Championships was held in Baku, Azerbaijan from 21 July – 4 August 2017. 932 athletes from 43 countries contested 79 sets of medals in 25m, 50m, 300m, rifle and pistol, Shotgun and RT events. Qualification for the 2018 Youth Olympic Games also took place and included 10m events. The Championship was organised by the Azerbaijan Shooting Federation and the Youth and Sports Ministry.

Events
 83 (79 + 4) Events consist of (73 Medal Events) : 
 Senior Events : 28 M (14 Individual + 14 Team) + 16 W (8 Individual + 8 Team) + 3 Mixed Team = 47 (Women's Double Trap and Women's Double Trap Team not counted in medal table) so 45 Medal Events.
 Junior Events : 22 M (11 Individual + 11 Team) + 10 W (5 Individual + 5 Team) = 32 (Men's Double Trap, Men's Double Trap Team, Men's 50m Running Target Team and Men's 50m Running Target Mixed Team not counted in medal table) so 28 Medal Events. 
 47 + 32 = 79 Events / 45 + 28 = 73 Medal Events
 Youth Events : 2 M + 2 W = 4 (not counted in medal table) 4 Youth Events not counted in medal table.
 10 Events not counted in medal table (because of shortage of athletes or Youth Events).
In result, 47 Senior Events (45) + 32 Junior Events (28) + 4 Youth Events = 83 Events (73 in medal table)

Results

Men's Senior events (28)

Pistol

Rifle

300 m rifle

Shotgun

Running target

Women's Senior events (16)

Pistol

Rifle

300 m rifle

Shotgun

Mixed Senior events (3)

Men's Junior events (22)

Women's Junior events (10)

Youth Events
Qualification for the 2018 Youth Olympic Games (not counted in medal table).

Men's Youth events

Women's Youth events

Medal table
After 73 of 73 Events (36 Individual + 37 Team) (originally 79 events)
 45 Senior Events + 28 Junior Events = 73 (2 Senior and 4 Junior Events not counted in medal table). also Youth Events Not counted in table. because of Youth Olympic Qualification.
http://www.esc-shooting.org/documents/results/

Results Link
Results
Results Book

References

European Shooting Championships
European Shooting Championships
2017 European Shooting Championships
European Shooting Championships
Sports competitions in Baku
Shooting competitions in Azerbaijan
July 2017 sports events in Europe
August 2017 sports events in Europe